The Plummer House is a historic house at 314 Alabama Street in Beebe, Arkansas.  It is a single story wood-frame structure, with a gable roof, novelty siding, and a foundation of stone piers.  It is a vernacular double-pile box framed building, constructed about 1915.  It is a well-preserved example of this type of period construction in White County.

The house was listed on the National Register of Historic Places in 1992.

See also
National Register of Historic Places listings in White County, Arkansas

References

Houses on the National Register of Historic Places in Arkansas
Houses completed in 1915
Houses in White County, Arkansas
National Register of Historic Places in White County, Arkansas
Buildings and structures in Beebe, Arkansas
1915 establishments in Arkansas